Filippo Jacobio (also Filippo Giacomo) (died 6 March 1687) was a Roman Catholic prelate who served as Bishop of Policastro (1652–1671).

See also
Catholic Church in Italy

Biography
On 26 August 1652, Filippo Jacobio was appointed by Pope Innocent X as Bishop of Policastro. On 29 September 1652, he was consecrated bishop by Marcantonio Franciotti, Cardinal-Priest of Santa Maria della Pace, with Giovan Battista Foppa, Archbishop of Benevento, and Ranuccio Scotti Douglas, Bishop Emeritus of Borgo San Donnino, serving as co-consecrators. He served as Bishop of Policastro until his resignation on 17 April 1671. He died on 6 March 1687.

References

External links and additional sources
 (for Chronology of Bishops) 
 (for Chronology of Bishops) 

1687 deaths
17th-century Italian Roman Catholic bishops
Bishops appointed by Pope Innocent X